Finham Park School is a secondary school and sixth form with academy status. It is situated on Green Lane in Finham, Coventry, England.

In September 2003, it became the first Mathematics and Computing College in Coventry. The head teacher is Mr Chris Bishop, with Deputy Head teacher Ms S Megeney. The previous headteacher had been Mr Mark Bailie who was head between 2009 and 2017 and is now Executive Headteacher for the Finham Park Multi Academy Trust set up in 2015.

The school has 1,500 students across the five mandatory years and the two optional years of the sixth form.  The student intake is from the Finham, Styvechale, Cheylesmore, Green Lane, Gibbet Hill and Fenside districts of the city, plus certain parts of Earlsdon.

History
Finham Park School opened in 1970, but construction of the final school buildings was not completed until late 1971. Before Finham Park School opened, pupils in the area went to a variety of Coventry schools.

A sixth-form block was opened in 2006 and the old sixth-form block became the Personalised Learning Center (PLC), used for Supportive Studies for the main school.

In 2005, Finham Park School became the first school in Coventry to offer the IB Diploma Programme, as an alternative to A Levels. Upper sixth form students, the first to take the IB diploma from the school, sat their IB examinations in May 2007; though the IB Diploma is no longer offered.

In 2007, Finham Park was one of the first schools in England to test out the 'Biometric Cashless system' when buying food and drink items from school. Students have their thumbprint scan converted into an 11 digit number, and can then pay by having their thumbprint scanned into a system. Students' parents can top-up their child's account by using ParentPay – an online payment system allowing payments for lunches, trips, book etc.

In 2012 the main school buildings were all painted blue.

In January 2014, the school opened a fitness suite for use by students during and after the school day as well as by staff before and after school. The suite was officially opened by Coventry born athlete, David Moorcroft OBE on Friday 17 January 2014.

Bishop Ullathorne RC School is close by, towards the A45. The school gates of the two schools are between 5 and 10 minutes walking distance.

Colleges
The school now has five colleges:

These college names are based on different subspecies of lion, some being extinct.

Each pupil belongs to one of the colleges and participates in intercollegiate events to earn points for their house.

These school houses were previously split into Newton, Ada, Whittle, and Galileo; but in 2008 the houses were changed as above along with a new vertical tutoring system. Originally the school was divided into four houses: Leasowes, Manor, Stivichall and Cryfield. Stretton, Ryton, Waverley and Kingswood were added as the school approached capacity.

School buildings
A Block  – Reception, Psychology, Media, Film Studies, Drama, Gym and Sports Hall
B Block  – Modern Foreign Languages
C Block  – History, Religious Education, Social Studies and PSHE (Physical Social Health Education) 
D Block  – Geography, Adult Education and the School Library
E Block  – Refocus Centre, Canteen, and Music
H Block  – Information Technology, Computing, Business Studies, Maths, Textiles, Art and Food Technology
J Block  – Maths and Science
K Block  – Art, Drama and Design Technology
L Block  – Science
M Block  – English, Fitness Suite and Canteen
N Block  – Staff room
P Block  – WRL, Conextions, and Careers
R Block  – Site Service Offices and Storage
S Block  – Personalised Learning Centre (PLC)
T Block – Sixth Form Education Site

Most school buildings have two levels but D, E, P, R & S have 1 and A has 3.

Behaviour for learning system (BFL)
Finham Park School has a consequence system for bad behaviour and a reward system for good progress and work in class. The "consequence" system gets worse punishments as the student misbehaves; a C1 is a verbal warning, a C2 is a warning where your name gets written on the board, a C3 is a detention lasting 30 minutes, C4 is moved to another classroom and a detention lasting 1 hour and a C5 is an isolation.

In 2018, a new policy was introduced called "Restorative Justice". Alongside the regular consequence system, the wrongdoer(s) and the teacher that reported the bad behaviour engage in a restorative conversation, in an attempt to make amends between the teacher and student(s).

Notable alumni
Kate Dempsey (born 1962), poet.
Matthew Naylor (born 1996), cricketer.
Mark Wood (born 1966), explorer.

See also
Finham Park 2

References
OFSTED Report

External links
 Finham Park School

Academies in Coventry
Secondary schools in Coventry